Tenzing Namgyal (Wylie: bstan 'dzin rnam rgyal) was the sixth Chogyal (king) of Sikkim. He succeeded Phuntsog Namgyal II in 1780 and was succeeded himself by Tsugphud Namgyal in 1793.

During his reign Chogyal fled to Tibet, and later died there in exile.

References

External links
History of Sikkim

Monarchs of Sikkim
1769 births
1793 deaths